Integrated Modular Unmanned Ground System (UGS or iMUGS) is a European Union's Permanent Structured Cooperation (PESCO) project that aims to create a European standard unmanned ground system and develop scalable modular architecture for hybrid manned-unmanned systems, as well as increasing interoperability, situational awareness and speeding up decision making. The project is coordinated by Estonia, with 10 other European countries participating. It will use Milrem's existing THeMIS unmanned ground vehicle for different payloads.

The total cost of the programme is €32.6m, of which €30.6m was funded by the European Commission (EDIDP) and the remaining €2m by the participating countries collectively. The aim of the EDIDP programme is to strengthen the strategic autonomy of the European Union and the co-operation between member countries.

The project results will be shown in operational environments as part of military exercises or at separate testing events, the first demonstration is scheduled for Q2 2021 in Estonia, with later demonstrations planned in each member state.

Objectives 
Goal of the project is to build and demonstrate a system of unmanned ground and airborne vehicles that can perform a variety of surveillance and rescue tasks and standardise a European ecosystem for aerial and ground platforms, command, control and communications, sensors, payloads, and algorithms. The ethical aspects of robotics, artificial intelligence, and autonomous systems will be taken into account, Milrem said the system being developed would be under “meaningful human control”.

Requirements set by 7 members:

 Autonomy
 Cyber Security
 Communications & Vehicle to vehicle
 Command & Control, Interoperability
 Modular Standardized Open Architecture
 Swarming
 Manned-Unmanned Teaming & Operational Scenarios

Capabilities:

 Multi-mission capable platform to carry different payloads (transport, ISR, tethered UAV etc.) and sensors
 Cyber secure autonomous navigation capability for route and mission planning with different options for manned-unmanned teaming
 EW resilient Command & Control interface capable of swarming and interoperable with existing C4 systems

Members

Participating companies 
14 companies from across Europe are cooperating on the project:

  Milrem Robotics
  GT Cyber Technologies
  Estonian Military Academy
  Safran Electronics & Defense
  NEXTER Systems
  Krauss-Maffei Wegmann
  Diehl Defence
  Latvijas Mobilais Telefons
  Bittium
  Insta DefSec
  GMV Aerospace and Defence will be coordinator of the command and control and C4ISR interoperability subproject
  (UN)MANNED will develop the certifiable ground control station allowing one operator to control a large fleet of unmanned systems (Unmanned Aerial Vehicles and Unmanned Ground Vehicles).
  Royal Military Academy of Belgium will lead the sub-project on swarming, developing capabilities, enabling heterogeneous teams of robots to work as a group towards a common objective.
  dotOcean is member of the swarming team and develops algorithms to enable teamwork and cooperation in a fleet of networked robots.

See also

Common Security and Defence Policy
Permanent Structured Cooperation
European Main Battle Tank
European Patrol Corvette
Eurocopter Tiger
European External Action Service

References 

Intelligence
Unmanned ground combat vehicles